is a passenger railway station in located in the city of Habikino,  Osaka Prefecture, Japan, operated by the private railway operator Kintetsu Railway. The station is also the nearest station to the town of Taishi where no train station is located.

Lines
Kaminotaishi Station is served by the Minami Osaka Line, and is located 22.0 rail kilometers from the starting point of the line at Ōsaka Abenobashi Station.

Station layout
The station was consists of two opposed side platforms connected by a level crossing

Platforms

Adjacent stations

Express trains stop at this station on weekends and national holidays in October and November every year for Mikan-gari or Mandarin orange eating.

History
Kaminotaishi Station opened on March 29, 1929.

Passenger statistics
In fiscal 2018, the station was used by an average of 4,528 passengers daily.

Surrounding area
Eifuku-ji (Kami no Taishi)
Saiho-in
Tomb of Ono no Imoko
Tsuboi Hachiman Shrine
Kaminotaishi Mikan Field

See also
List of railway stations in Japan

References

External links

 Kintetsu: Kaminotaishi Station 

Railway stations in Japan opened in 1929
Railway stations in Osaka Prefecture
Habikino